WNOV  (860 AM) is a community-oriented urban contemporary radio station located in Milwaukee, Wisconsin. WNOV is the only station owned by Courier Communications, but on January 18, 2008 it was leased to a new company called Radio Multi-Media, which took over operations. As of January 24, 2012, the AM and FM translator went silent. WNOV later returned on the air in May 2012, broadcasting an urban contemporary format.

History
WNOV began broadcasting in 1946 as WFOX, and at one time, aired a country music format. They became WNOV in 1967 and began targeting programming toward the local African-American community. WNOV aired a variety of African-American-oriented programming, ranging from rhythm and blues music, gospel music, hip-hop and community affairs shows. In the past, they were notable for their controversial local talk show hosts, particularly former Milwaukee alderman Michael McGee, Sr. In 2008, WNOV shifted to an urban AC format, but moved back to a broader urban contemporary direction to more effectively compete with WKKV, resulting in WNOV being placed on Mediabase's Urban reporting panel.

In December 2009, WNOV acquired a low-powered translator at 102.5 FM and launched an Urban AC simulcast on the signal. The translator is licensed to the North Shore suburb of Mequon, but transmits from the WNOV transmitter site. The station, W273AT, was billed on-air as "Majic 102.5." In 2011, the simulcast shifted to Mainstream Urban.

In 2010, WNOV filed a request with the FCC to relocate the signal to 93.9 FM and the AM/FM combined operating license (COL) to Milwaukee as a way to better serve the area. This is due to interference from WNWC in Madison, which also broadcasts at 102.5. They also changed their slogan to "102.5 The Beat" after Clear Channel ordered a Cease & Desist over the use of the "Majic" moniker.

On January 24, 2012, WNOV and W273AT both went off the air. Courier Communications filed a request for Special Temporary Authority (STA)  with the FCC, as Courier and Radio Multi-Media have entered litigation, due to ongoing disputes and removal of station equipment. Although Courier did announce plans to return WNOV to the airwaves once replacement equipment is in place, the company filed another STA on March 29, 2012, which could leave the station off the air until March 2013, which means that if the station does not return to air before then or the litigation is not resolved, the license is returned to the FCC and could be deleted (the station's license expires on December 31, 2012, another reason the STA was requested). In May 2012, WNOV resumed broadcasting but it is not clear at this point whether the return is only temporary. This move may be due to Radio Multi-Media's bankruptcy, which resulted in WWPW/Louisville being taken off the air after it failed to make payments to WAY-FM, which owned WWPW's signal.

In the Summer of 2012, WNOV, minus the FM translator (which was deleted from the FCC database), returned to the airwaves with a new name and new format. The station now goes by the name "The New WNOV" broadcasting an Urban Contemporary Format. Current weekday programs on the station includes "The Rickey Smiley Morning Show" from 5am-9am and "The Forum " with Sherwin Hughes from 9am-11am. Weekend programs includes Gospel from 6am-9am Saturdays and all day Sunday with Rev. Charles Green, the Baka Boyz syndicated program, the Blues Lounge with Devo Saturdays 9:30-1pm, "G Jams" with Ernie G from 1pm-5pm Saturdays and a local Reggae show Saturdays from 7pm-9pm. The station runs automated at other times. The station was rebranded as "860 WNOV, The Voice" in fall 2013.

WNOV returned an FM translator to the air in March 2017 at 106.5 FM, W293CX, which was moved south from Park Falls, Wisconsin during the FCC's AM revitalization transmission window. Its signal covers the core of Milwaukee, although it must accept interference from Sheboygan's WHBZ, also on 106.5.

On-Air lineup
Legends have passed through the halls of WNOV over the years. Bobby O'Jay, Jim Frazier, Michael Hightower, Earl Stokes, Ernie G, and Larry K. Myles. Some more of the heavy weight air talent to have graced the WNOV microphones over the years included Maestro, Steve Hegwood, (later top executive at Radio One and himself an owner/operator of several radio stations), Jerry Smokin' B (who moved onto programming and afternoon drive at such stations as V103 Atlanta), Kevin Stone (Afternoon's at KJMZ and K104 Dallas, Morning's KHYS 98.5 Houston, Afternoon's WHRK Memphis, Producer of Brian McKnight Christmas Specials, National talent ABC Radio Networks) "The Real Deal" Mike Neil (mornings KYOK Houston, afternoons at B94 and 104.7 The Beat WJJJ Pittsburgh and KALC Denver) and Reggie Brown (a.k.a. Reg UJ, later Afternoons at WGCI Chicago and eventually back in Milwaukee at V100 100.7 FM). Other notables Rockman Jr, Homer Blow, Rob Hardy, Tony Neal (Founder/CEO of the Core DJ's, The Largest DJ organization in the world), and Brother Eugene Matthews all called "The Incredible AM" 860 home at one time.

At one time WNOV ran "The Rickey Smiley Morning Show", "The Lady Pink Show" and Michael Baisden. These shows were later dropped. Swiss Money Live Entertainment was the only local weekday show on WNOV airing Thursday and Friday nights.

Weekend programming included "Old School Reunion with Wayne the Magic Man" and "The Weekend Rollcall" with DJ Mike Mill on Saturdays and "Praise Mixdown", "New Pitts Gospel Hour" with Michelle Pitts and "SD Cooper Law Program" on Sundays.

Controversy
On May 3, 2007 on his morning show, Michael McGee, Sr. praised the death of the mother of another radio personality, WTMJ's Charlie Sykes, whom McGee was a timeslot rival of for years, with both hosts often referring to each other in negative terms. Sykes' mother, Katherine B. Sykes, died in a house fire from smoke inhalation two days before the comments were made. He stated that her death was "the vengeance of God" and insinuated that Sykes played a role in the death of his mother. On May 5, 2007, the station announced that the show, which was broadcast under a brokered programming agreement where McGee paid for his daily air time, would be hosted instead by McGee's son, then-current Milwaukee alderman Michael McGee, Jr., while the elder McGee was on "indefinite" suspension.

Three weeks later on May 28, 2007, McGee, Jr. was arrested and jailed on federal charges of bribery and extortion and local charges of attempted assault and solicitation for murder. After being found guilty of 9 charges in June 2008, Michael McGee Jr. was sentenced to 6 and a half years in prison by U.S. District Judge Charles Clevert. He served his term and was released at the end of 2015.

References

External links
WNOV's website

Talk Show Host Says He's Glad Radio Rival's Mother Is Dead
Alderman McGee Charged With Extortion, Bribery
FCC History Cards for WNOV

African-American history of Milwaukee
Urban contemporary radio stations in the United States
NOV